The Kawasaki Ki-102 (Army Type 4 assault aircraft) was a Japanese warplane of World War II. It was a twin-engine, two-seat, long-range heavy fighter developed to replace the Ki-45 Toryu. Three versions were planned: the Ki-102a day fighter, Ki-102b ground-attack and Ki-102c night fighter. This aircraft's Allied reporting name was "Randy".

Design and history
The Ki-102 entered service in 1944, but saw limited action. The main type (102b) was kept in reserve to protect Japan, although it did see some limited duty in the Okinawa campaign. It was kept out of front line service because it was hoped that it would be the carrier of the Igo-1-B air-to-ground guided missile when the Allied invasion of Japan occurred.

Variants
 Ki-102
prototypes, three built
 Ki-102a (Type Kō)
Externally similar to the 102b, but with turbosuperchargers that enabled the engine to maintain its rating at higher altitudes. The 57 mm (2.24 in) cannon was swapped in favor of a 37 mm (1.46 in) cannon, and the 12.7 mm (.50 in) rear gun was deleted, 26 built.
 Ki-102b (Type Otsu)
Ground-attack variant similar to prototypes, except with revised tail wheel, 207 built
 Ki-102c (Type Hei)
Night fighter version with lengthened fuselage and span. Radar under a Plexiglas dome, oblique-firing 20 mm cannons, and the 20 mm cannons in the belly replaced with 30 mm (1.18 in) cannons in Schräge Musik behind the cockpit, two built.
 Ki-108
High-altitude fighter prototype with pressurised cabin, two conversions from Ki-102b aircraft using the structural improvements used on the 102c.
 Ki-108 Kai
Improved version of the Ki-108 with longer fuselage and enlarged wings. Two built.

Specifications (Ki-102b)

See also

Footnotes

References

Further reading

 
 

Ki-102
Ki-102, Kawasaki
Low-wing aircraft
Ki-102, Kawasaki
Aircraft first flown in 1944
Twin piston-engined tractor aircraft